The 2019 Istria Cup was the 7th edition of Istria Cup, a friendly women's association football tournament played in the Croatia.

Teams

Group stage

Group A

Group B

Placement matches
Fifth place

Third place

First place

Goalscorers
3 goals

  Daryna Apanashchenko
  Veronika Andrukhiv

2 goals

  Alma Kamerić
  Nađa Stanović
  Marija Vuković
  Lara Prašnikar

1 goal

  Merjema Medić
  Biljana Bradić
  Violeta Slović
  Tijana Filipović
  Miljana Smiljković
  Dominika Čonč
  Adrijana Mori
  Mateja Zver

1 own goal
  Helena Božić with Croatia.

References

External links

February 2019 sports events in Europe
2018–19 in Croatian football
2019
Istria Cup
Istria Cup